Hans-Günter Richardi (born 1939, Berlin) is a German author and journalist, residing in Dachau.

Life
Richardi, a long-time editor of the Süddeutsche Zeitung, was very engaged in his books on the history of Nazism. For his research, the author has received several awards. He is a carrier of the Order of Merit of the International Dachau Committee and the Public Service Medal of the city of Dachau, and an honor and board member of the International committee of Dachau. The first Dachau guide was written by him.

Another one of Richardi's intensively researched topics is the Transport of concentration camp inmates to Tyrol at the hands of the SS in South Tyrol on 30 April 1945. He co-founded the contemporary Braies history archive at the Hotel Braies, where the odyssey of prominent prisoners ended.

References

1939 births
Living people
Journalists from Berlin